Pinaki Majumdar (born 26 January 1964) is an Indian condensed matter physicist and the director of the  Harish-Chandra Research Institute. Known for his research on correlated quantum systems, Majumdar is a recipient of the Global Indus Technovator Award of the Massachusetts Institute of Technology. The Council of Scientific and Industrial Research, the apex agency of the Government of India for scientific research, awarded him the Shanti Swarup Bhatnagar Prize for Science and Technology, one of the highest Indian science awards, for his contributions to physical sciences in 2007.

Biography 

Born on 26 January 1964 in West Bengal, Pinaki Majumdar graduated in engineering from Jadavpur University in 1986 and continued his studies at the Indian Institute of Technology, Madras from where he earned a master's degree (MTech) in 1990. His doctoral studies were at the Indian Institute of Science and after earning a PhD in 1996, he did his post-doctoral work at Bell Laboratories, New Jersey for a couple of years. Returning to India, he joined Harish-Chandra Research Institute as a fellow in 1998. He has since held various positions at HRI such as those of a reader (2001–03) and an associate professor (2003–07) before becoming a full professor in 2007. He continues his association with the institute, holding the positions of the director and grade-1 professor. He also serves as a professor at Homi Bhabha National Institute.

Legacy and honors 
Majumdar's research was mainly focused on disordered and strongly correlated quantum systems and his studies have assisted in a wider understanding of the metal-insulator transition. He is also reported to have contributed to the studies of nanoscale texture formation and colossal response driven by external fields. His studies have been documented by way of a number of articles and Google Scholar, an online article repository of scientific articles, has listed 93 of them.

Majumdar won the Institute Merit Prize and Silver Medal of the Indian Institute of Technology, Madras in 1990 when he passed out of the institute. The Council of Scientific and Industrial Research awarded Pinaki the Shanti Swarup Bhatnagar Prize, one of the highest Indian science awards in 2007. He received two awards in 2008; the Outstanding Research Investigator Award of the Safety Review Committee of the Department of Atomic Energy (DAE-SRC and the Global Indus Technovator Award of Massachusetts Institute of Technology.

Selected bibliography

See also 
 Quantum systems

Notes

References

Further reading

External links 
 

Recipients of the Shanti Swarup Bhatnagar Award in Physical Science
Scientists from West Bengal
Indian scientific authors
1964 births
Living people
Jadavpur University alumni
IIT Madras alumni
Indian Institute of Science alumni
Bell Labs
Indian condensed matter physicists
Scientists from Allahabad